The Portrait of Bartolomeo Bonghi is an oil on canvas portrait by Italian artist Giovanni Battista Moroni, created in 1553. It is held at the Metropolitan Museum of Art, in New York. It depicts Bartolomeo Bonghi, a 16th-century Italian legal scholar. The portrait presents its subject as he was in life; a man of wealth and status. The buildings seen in the top left-hand corner of the painting identify the site of the portrait's sitting as Bergamo in Lombardy.

In the portrait, Bartolomeo Bonghi is dressed in a professorial robe and a hat. He is shown holding a book on Roman civil law.

References

1553 paintings
Paintings by Giovanni Battista Moroni
Portraits of men
Paintings in the collection of the Metropolitan Museum of Art
Books in art